Mabee is a surname. Notable people with the surname include:

Carleton Mabee (1914–2014), American writer
Christopher Mabee (born 1985), Canadian figure skater
James Pitt Mabee (1859–1912), Canadian lawyer, judge and railway commissioner
John C. Mabee (1921–2002), American racehorse owner and breeder
Ray Mabee (1901-1965), American politician

See also
Mabee House, a historic house in Schenectady County, New York, United States
Mabee Arena, a sports venue in Salina, Kansas, United States
Mabee Corner, Ohio, an unincorporated community
Maybee (disambiguation)